Ghar Ek Sapnaa is a Hindi television serial that aired on Sahara One channel worldwide. It is based on the story of a young woman, Kakul, whose dreams are shattered when she learns that her husband does not love her and she is not accepted by her in-laws.

Cast

 Sayantani Ghosh / Anisha Kapur as Kakul Samman Chaudhary
Anisha Kapur as Damini (look-alike of Kakul)
 Ujjwal Rana / Ankur Nayyar as Samman Chaudhary (Kakul's Husband)
Darshan Dave as Sujeet (Trisha's husband)(Devika's Husband)
Alok Nath as Amarnath Chaudhary (Samman's father)
Himani Shivpuri as Uttara (Amarnath's wife)
Shammi (actress) as Dadi (Amarnath's mother)
Harsh Chhaya as Dr. Rishabh (Samman's older brother)
Lata Sabharwal as Cynthia (Rishabh's first wife, killed in a car accident)
Niki Aneja Walia as Simi Ahuja (lawyer, Dr. Rishabh's friend and second wife)
 Chinky Jaiswal as Sonia Ahuja (Simi Ahuja's Daughter)
Barkha Madan as Devika (Samman's sister, later Sujeet's wife)
Vinod Singh as Vicky (Devika's boyfriend, now dead)
Vindhya Tiwari as Mritika (Samman's sister, now dead) episodes 2–74, episodes 210–233
Jeetu Malkani as Ahaan  (in love with Mritika) episodes 205–231
Jaya Binju as Tulika (Samman's sister)
Sachal Tyagi as Abhi (son of Nana, Tulika's boyfriend)
Nagesh Bhosle as Nana (best friend of Sujeet and Om Shankar)
Piyush Sahdev / Hasan Zaidi ... Sharad (Samman's younger brother)
Upsana Shukla as Neha (Sharad's wife)
 Resham Tipnis as Trisha (Kakul's Older Sister, Died in Child Birth)
Vineet Kumar as Om Shankar (Sujeet and Samman's father-in-law, Trisha and Kakul's father)
 Varun Badola as Gautam (Vanshika's Hushand)
Kavita Kaushik / Arzoo Govitrikar as Vanshika (Samman's ex-girlfriend)
Mehul Buch as Dhanraj Saxena (Vanshika and Neha's father, Gautam's father-in-law)
 Mahesh Shetty as Shlok Verma (Step Brother of Sharad and Mrittika, Brother of Ansh)
Ali Merchant as Ansh Verma (Shlok's younger brother, killed by him)
Neha Marda

References

External links
Official website

Indian television soap operas
Sahara One original programming
2007 Indian television series debuts
2009 Indian television series endings